The Lancair 320 is a two-seat single-engined light aircraft marketed in kit form by the U.S. general aviation manufacturer Lancair. It is based on the Lancair 235, but with a larger fuselage and more powerful engine, and like the 235, it is a low-winged monoplane of composite construction with a retractable tricycle undercarriage, with side-by-side seating in an enclosed cockpit.  The Lancair 360 is similar, but with a more powerful engine.

In 1990 the ACT Apache 1, based on the Lancair 320 was proposed to be jointly built by Aerotech S.A. of Switzerland and Aviation Composite Technology Inc. in the Philippines for use by the Armed Forces of the Philippines and the Philippine National Police.

Specifications

References
Notes

Bibliography
Lancair retrieved June 24, 2008
Lancair 320 story and info SW Aviator retrieved June 24, 2008

External links

320
Homebuilt aircraft
Single-engined tractor aircraft
Low-wing aircraft